Juan Ramón "Juanra" Bonet Alba (born 6 June 1974) is a Spanish television presenter, actor and comedian. He has presented the Antena 3 game show ¡Boom! since 2014.

Biography
Bonet was born in Barcelona, where he grew up in the Horta-Guinardó neighbourhood. After a chance meeting with a friend who was heading to an audition, he began training as an actor. He left his hometown in 2005, when he joined the cast of Telecinco's topical humour show Caiga quien caiga. In 2011, he toured performing Animales, an adaptation of Ricky Gervais's monologues Animals and Politics.

After presenting on La 2, Cuatro and La Sexta, Bonet signed a long-term contract with Antena 3 in July 2014, to present a new game show produced by Gestmusic. This show began in September, titled ¡Boom!.

In 2015, Bonet took part on Tu cara me suena, another Gestmusic show on Antena 3 franchised internationally as Your Face Sounds Familiar; he performed "Tainted Love" as Soft Cell's Marc Almond. Since 2019, he has been a backstage reporter on La Voz and La Voz Kids, versions of The Voice for the same channel. Bonet received an Antena de Oro award in 2019.

In January 2020, Bonet hosted the revival of ¿Quién quiere ser millonario?, the Spanish version of Who Wants to Be a Millionaire?. In June that year, he took part in a special crossover episode of Pasapalabra against ¡Ahora caigo! host Arturo Valls.

Since February 2023, Bonet has hosted El círculo de famosos, the Spanish version of The Wheel, on Antena 3.

References

1974 births
Living people
Male actors from Barcelona
Spanish male comedians
Spanish television presenters
Spanish game show hosts